Agrionoptera insignis is a species of dragonfly in the family Libellulidae.
It is native to much of eastern Asia and Oceania, occurring as far north as Japan and as far south as Australia. 
It is common in most of its range. The circumscription of the species is not entirely clear, so if the species is redescribed, its status may change.
Common names include grenadier.

The male of this species is generally 37 to 41 millimeters long, the hindwing about 28 to 30 millimeters long. The thorax is metallic green with yellow mottling. The eyes are brown and yellow. The abdomen is mostly red with a black tip. The abdomen of the female is duller in color.

This species lives in swampy areas, including disturbed habitat.

Subspecies
There are several subspecies, not all of which are thought to be valid taxa.

Subspecies include:
Agrionoptera insignis allogenes – red swampdragon; Australia, New Guinea, Solomon Islands, possibly New Caledonia
Agrionoptera insignis chalcochiton – Indonesia
Agrionoptera insignis insignis – Southeast Asia and Sundaland - Grenadier
Agrionoptera insignis insularis – Solomon Islands
Agrionoptera insignis lifuana – New Caledonia
Agrionoptera insignis nereis – Enggano Island
Agrionoptera insignis nicobarica – Nicobar Islands
Agrionoptera insignis papuensis – New Guinea
Agrionoptera insignis similis – Orchid Island, Taiwan

See also
 List of Odonata species of Australia

References

Libellulidae
Odonata of Australia
Insects of Australia
Odonata of Oceania
Odonata of Asia
Taxa named by Jules Pierre Rambur
Insects described in 1842